Dunikowski Ridge is a ridge trending northwest–southeast and rising to about  northeast of Legru Bay, King George Island, in the South Shetland Islands. It was named following geological work by the Polish Antarctic Expedition, 1977–79, after Xawery Dunikowski, the Polish sculptor.

See also 
Stamp Buttress

References 

Ridges of King George Island (South Shetland Islands)
Poland and the Antarctic